When Heaven Burns is a 2011 Hong Kong television serial produced by TVB and starring Bowie Lam, Moses Chan, Kenny Wong, Charmaine Sheh and Angela Tong. First revealed during TVB's Sales Presentation 2009 in 2008, filming took place in late 2009 to early 2010, with the first episode airing both in Hong Kong and TVB's overseas affiliates and partners on 21 November 2011. On 27 December 2011, the show was blacklisted by the Chinese State Administration of Radio, Film, and Television, making it the first Hong Kong television drama to be censored in Mainland China in more than two decades.

Despite being the second lowest-rated TVB drama of 2011, When Heaven Burns gained a strong cult following online and received critical acclaim in Hong Kong, winning Best Drama at the 2012 TVB Anniversary Awards.

Plot
In their youth Joe (Bowie Lam), Angus (Moses Chan), Ronnie (Kenny Wong) and Ka Ming are good friends and bandmates. During a mountaineering trip, the four are stranded on a snow bound mountain and Ka Ming was gravely injured and gets eaten by the other three. This event has a traumatic effect on them, their friendship, and their friendship with Yan (Charmaine Sheh), Ka Ming's girlfriend, leading the previously close group to go their separate ways and abandon their friendship.

Eighteen years later, Yan who remains haunted by the memory of Ka Ming, leads an unfulfilled and occasionally self-destructive personal life while enjoying success professionally as a jaded but popular radio announcer. Joe, Angus and Ronnie have also forged their own successful professional paths, albeit with drastic changes to their actual personalities and characteristics.

A chance incident reunites them and they bonded again. Unfortunately the discovery of Ka Ming’s long buried body brought their long held dark secret to the surface and frayed their fragile ties to one another leading each of them to finally confront their true selves. The resulting conflicts bring permanent changes and tragic consequences to all of them, but also a just resolution to their moral dilemmas in accordance with the life decisions they made.

The poetic, well thought out ending was satisfying and thought-provoking in equal measures regarding topics of whether there exists such a thing as karmic retribution and whether different decisions will lead to different consequences in life or if they will all still lead to the same ultimate outcome: free will vs fate.

Additionally, the serial also addresses the modern Hong Kong public’s concerns and anxieties such as a gloomy political outlook, social injustices and the increasing disregard of moral values in the years since its handover back to China. 

There are also sharp commentaries on the appalling moral quality of the members of the Legislative Council and the forgetful tendencies of the Hong Kong society as a whole. Emphasis on values such as free will, choice of rights, independent personality, and resistance to hegemony accurately reflects the public's disaffection and thus resonated with younger more politically aware audiences.

Cast

The Lau family

The Yung family

The Cheng family

The Yip family

Workers' Right Protection Association

Ching Ho Finance

CC Radio

Other cast

Viewership ratings

Theme songs
The opening and closing theme songs of When Heaven Burns were composed by Paul Wong, formerly of the Hong Kong band Beyond. Paul Wong is the guitarist for both songs and is the vocalist for the opening theme. The closing theme is sung by the three male leads and serves as the reconstructed lost song.

The plot line of a band returning home with one of their member dead has led to comparisons between the fictional band and Beyond.

Censorship in mainland China
On 27 December 2011, with four episodes to go, China's State Administration of Radio, Film, and Television ordered the sub-licensees to withdraw the video streaming on 11 websites based on the pretext of cannibalism, making When Heaven Burns the first Hong Kong soap opera series to be censored in Mainland China in over two decades. The real-time relay in Guangdong province was unaffected, however, and the remaining episodes were shown on television without hindrance in that province. The underlying reason for this withdrawal was thought to be because of the show's underlying allusions to the Tiananmen Square protests of 1989 and non-mainland China media considered this move as censorship. The storyline and the characters demonstrated similarities to the Tiananmen Square protest. When interviewed by Hong Kong's Apple Daily, the show's screenwriter agreed that the story was inspired by the government crackdown on the student democracy movement.

Awards and nominations
On 17 December 2012, When Heaven Burns won the TVB Anniversary Award for best drama in 2012, the award was a result of a popular vote.

2012 TVB Anniversary Awards
Best Drama
Nominated – Best Actress (Charmaine Sheh) – Top 5
Nominated – My Favourite Female Character (Charmaine Sheh) – Top 10

My AOD Favourite Awards 2012
Nominated – Best Drama
Nominated – Best Actress (Charmaine Sheh) – Top 5
Nominated – Top 15 Character (Charmaine Sheh)
Nominated – Top 15 Character (Bowie Lam)
Nominated – Best Theme Song (年少無知 by Bowie Lam, Moses Chan and Kenny Wong)

CASH Golden Sail Music Awards 2012
Best Chorus Performance (年少無知 by Bowie Lam, Moses Chan and Kenny Wong)

17th Asian Television Awards 2012
Best Actor – Moses Chan

Metro Radio Hits Music Awards 2012
My Most Appreciated Song (年少無知 by Paul Wong)

Ultimate Song Chart Awards 2012
WeChat Chit Chat Most Popular Song (年少無知 by Bowie Lam, Moses Chan and Kenny Wong)
My Favourite Song (年少無知 by Bowie Lam, Moses Chan and Kenny Wong)

RTHK Top 10 Gold Songs Awards 2012
Top 10 Gold Songs
Nominated – Top 10 Singers (Bowie Lam, Moses Chan and Kenny Wong)

References

External links 
 

TVB dramas
Cannibalism in fiction
Thriller television series
2011 Hong Kong television series debuts
2012 Hong Kong television series endings
2010s Hong Kong television series
Hong Kong television series
Television censorship in China
Censored television series